Ömürbek Toktogulovich Babanov (born 20 May 1970) is a Kyrgyz politician who served twice as the Prime Minister of Kyrgyzstan in 2011–12.

Political career 
Before his appointment as Prime Minister, Babanov was Deputy Prime Minister in the government of Almazbek Atambayev. He was also acting Prime Minister from 23 September 2011 until 14 November 2011, as Prime Minister Atambayev was a candidate in the presidential election. He again became acting Prime Minister on 1 December 2011 when Atambayev took office as President. He was confirmed by Parliament on 23 December 2011. On 1 September 2012 Babanov resigned as Prime Minister.

Babanov participated in Kyrgyzstan's presidential election in 2017 as an independent. During a television debate, candidate Sooronbay Jeenbekov promised to imprison Babanov as part of a proposed fight against corruption. He came second to Jeenbekov with 33% of the vote.

Family and wealth
With an estimated wealth of $1.5 billion, he is one of the richest people in Kyrgyzstan.

Babanov is half-Turkish and half-Kyrgyz. His mother was from the Turkish Meskhetian minority group in Georgia; she was forcefully deported from Batumi to Kyrgyzstan during World War II. Babanov's wife is Kazakh. His family's ethnic background were used to smear him during the 2017 election.

Controversy
On May 31, 2021, he was detained as part of an investigation involving the Kumtor Gold Mine.

References 

|-

1970 births
Living people
Meskhetian Turkish people
Soviet people of Turkish descent
Kyrgyzstani people of Turkish descent
Prime Ministers of Kyrgyzstan
Respublika Party of Kyrgyzstan politicians
People from Shymkent
Kyrgyzstani billionaires
Members of the Supreme Council (Kyrgyzstan)